Above the Law is a 2017 Belgian-French crime thriller film directed by François Troukens and Jean-François Hensgens. Frank Valken a career criminal, commits a bank heist with his crew, and is set up by corrupt police, for the murder of a judge investigating the 30 year old unsolved case of the mass murders of Brabant who had been duped into being at the getaway scene, and for killing bystanders who witness the murder.

Above the Law had its world premiere at the 74th Venice International Film Festival. It received nine nominations at the 9th Magritte Awards, including Best Film and Best Director for Troukens and Hensgens. It went on to win Best Actress for Lubna Azabal.

Cast
 Lubna Azabal as Lucie Tesla
 Olivier Gourmet as Frank Valken
 Kevin Janssens as Vik
 Bouli Lanners as Danny Bouvy
  as Santo
 Bérénice Baoo as Nora
 Anne Coesens as Hélène
 Johan Leysen as Jean Lemoine
 Natacha Régnier as Véronique Pirotte
 Jean-Louis Sbille as Minister Van Bollen
 Slimane Dazi as the prison officer

Reception
The film received positive reviews. Jessica Kiang of Variety wrote: "While hardly boasting the most original of plots, it is informed by an authenticity rare for this popular genre with its pre-packaged tropes and formulae."

Accolades

References

External links
 

2017 films
2017 crime thriller films
Belgian crime thriller films
Crime films based on actual events
French crime thriller films
2010s French-language films
2010s serial killer films
2017 directorial debut films
Thriller films based on actual events
French serial killer films
French-language Belgian films
2010s French films